Nils Hønsvald (4 December 1899 – 24 November 1971) was a Norwegian newspaper editor and politician for the Labour Party. He was one of the leading figures in Norwegian politics from 1945 to 1969. He served as President of the Nordic Council in 1958 and 1963.

Hønsvald was born in Horten, Vestfold County, Norway. He was editor of Østfold Arbeiderblad in Sarpsborg, regional newspaper for the Norwegian Labour Party which was discontinued in 1929 and editor of  Sarpsborg Arbeiderblad, a local newspaper published in Sarpsborg (1929–1969).

He participated in the Left Communist Youth League's military strike action of 1924. He was convicted for assisting in this crime and sentenced to 120 days of prison. He was later present at the congress of 24 April 1927 when the Left Communist Youth League was merged with the Socialist Youth League to found the Workers' Youth League.

During the occupation of Norway by Nazi Germany, he was arrested in March 1941. He was incarcerated at Møllergata 19 before being transferred to Ånebyleiren concentration camp and then to Grini concentration camp in May. He was released on 12 June 1941. In December 1944 he was arrested again, and was transferred from Fredrikstad to Grini, where he remained until the war's end.

Hønsvald was Minister of Supplies and Reconstruction (1948–1950), and minister without ministry in 1950. Hønsvald was President of the Lagting (1961–1965) and President of the Odelsting (1965–1969). Nils Hønsvalds gate in Sarpsborg was named in his honor.

References

External links
Photograph of Nils Hønsvald

1899 births
1971 deaths
People from Horten
Labour Party (Norway) politicians
Government ministers of Norway
Members of the Storting
Norwegian prisoners and detainees
Prisoners and detainees of Norway
Norwegian resistance members
Grini concentration camp survivors
Vice Presidents of the Storting
20th-century Norwegian politicians